Westonbirt with Lasborough is a civil parish in the district of Cotswold, in the county of Gloucestershire, England. It includes the villages of Lasborough and Westonbirt. As of 2019, it has a population of 293.

History 
Lasborough was formerly a separate parish but was united with Westonbirt by the mid 17th century.

References

External links 

 Parish council

Civil parishes in Gloucestershire
Cotswold District